The 2002 NatWest Series was a One Day International cricket tri-series sponsored by the National Westminster Bank that took place in England between 27 June and 13 July 2002. The series involved the national teams of England, India and Sri Lanka. Ten matches were played in total, with each team playing one another thrice during the group stage. The teams which finished in the top two positions following the group stages qualified for the final, which India won by defeating England at Lord's on 13 July by 2 wickets. Preceding the series, England played Sri Lanka in a three Test series, while following the series, India played England in a four Test series.

Venues

Squads

Fixtures

Final

Statistics

References

External links
National Westminster Bank Series 2002 at CricketArchive

2002 in English cricket
International cricket competitions in 2002
NatWest Group